Calotes chincollium is a species of agamid lizard. It is endemic to Myanmar.

Calotes chincollium occurs in areas of shifting cultivation and secondary forest but not in primary forest. It is primarily terrestrial but may also climb onto the base of trees.

References

Calotes
Lizards of Asia
Reptiles of Myanmar
Endemic fauna of Myanmar
Reptiles described in 2003